Overlangbroek is a former village in the Dutch province of Utrecht. It is a part of the municipality of Wijk bij Duurstede, and lies about 11 km southeast of Zeist. The village officially merged with Nederlangbroek into Langbroek in 1978.

References 

Populated places in Utrecht (province)
Former municipalities of Utrecht (province)
Wijk bij Duurstede